Edifying Discourses in Diverse Spirits or Upbuilding Discourses in Various Spirits are English translations for the title of a work published on March 13, 1847, by Søren Kierkegaard. The book is divided into three parts just as Either/Or was in 1843 and many of his other discourses were. Kierkegaard had been working toward creating a place for the concepts of guilt and sin in the conscience of the single individual. He discussed the ideas generated by both Johann von Goethe and Friedrich Hegel concerning reason and nature. This book is his response to the ideas that nature and reason are perfect.

The first part of the book is a challenge to those who say they are not guilty of anything. Kierkegaard plays the questioner and asks tough questions throughout the text, such as, "What is patience? Is not patience the courage that freely takes upon itself the suffering that cannot be avoided?" "Are you now living in such a way that you are aware of being a single individual and thereby aware of your eternal responsibility before God." "Is not evil, just like evil people, at odds with itself, divided in itself?" "What is it to be more ashamed before others than before oneself but to be more ashamed of seeming than being?" "Should not he who planted the ear hear? But is not the opposite conclusion just as beautiful and convincing: Should not he whose life is sacrificing love believe that God is love?" "What means do you use to perform your work; is the means just as important to you as the end, just exactly as important?"

The second part has to do with the idea that nature  is perfect. He goes back to Job as he did in his Four Upbuilding Discourses, 1843. He says, "The silent friends did not compare Job with themselves—this did not happen until their respect (in which they silently held him) ceased and they broke the silence in order to attack the sufferer with speeches, but their presence prompted Job to compare himself with himself. No individual can be present, even though in silence, in such a way that his presence means nothing at all by way of comparison. At best, this can be done by a child, who indeed has a certain likeness to the lilies of the field and the birds of the air." "God isolated the human being, made every human being this separate and distinct individual, which is implied in the unconditional character of those first thoughts. The individual animal is not isolated, is not unconditionally separate entity; the individual animal is a number and belongs under what that most famous pagan thinker has called the animal category: the crowd. The human being who in despair turns away from those first thoughts in order to plunge into the crowd of comparisons makes himself a number, regards himself as a beast, no matter whether he by way of comparison is distinguished or lowly. But with the lilies the worried one is isolated, far away from all human or, perhaps more correctly, inhuman comparisons between individuals."

The third part deals with the concept of the abstract and the concrete examples. Kierkegaard wrote of individuals known only as A and B in his first book, Either/Or. He then made them less abstract by making A into the Young Man in Repetition (1843) and B into his guide, the psychiatrist Constantin Constantius. The same day that he published Repetition he published Fear and Trembling which showed Abraham as an individual who was alone with God as he considered whether to follow his commands. He continued writing until he came to the concrete human being named Christ and wrote about the joy there is in following Christ. He's not against the ethics of Hegel or the aesthetics of Goethe but thinks that following Christ is the one thing needful. And that double-mindedness is the beginning of the sickness of the spirit for the single individual.

Structure
The book begins with a dedication just as some of his Eighteen Upbuilding Discourses did, however, this book is not dedicated to his father, but to “That Single Individual”. He published these discourses and later wrote a longer dedication called The Crowd is Untruth where he wrote:  This, which is now considerably revised and enlarged, was written and intended to accompany the dedication to "that single individual," which is found in "Upbuilding Discourses in Various Spirits." Copenhagen, Spring 1847.

Walter Lowrie translated The Point of View of My Work as an Author by Kierkegaard in 1939, 1962 and included My Activity as a Writer by Soren Kierkegaard (1851) in the book. Here Kierkegaard wrote, "I attached myself again religiously to "that individual", to whom the next essential work (after the Concluding Postscript) was dedicated. I refer to Edifying Discourses in Divers Spirits, or rather the first part of that book which is an exhortation to confession. Perhaps nobody noticed it the first time I employed the category "that individual", and nobody paid much attention to the fact that it was repeated in stereotyped form in the preface of every number of the Edifying Discourses. Religiously speaking, there is no such thing as a public, but only individuals; for religion is seriousness and seriousness is the individual."

This book has a preface and Kierkegaard has said to pay attention to the prefaces in his book of the same name. The book also has a dedication. Here is the first half of his preface. Kierkegaard thinks an individual must bring the occasion (the need) along with them to become the learner.

On the Occasion of a Confession
On the Occasion of a Confession was a postscript to the first section of Three Discourses on Imagined Occasions (On the Occasion of a Confessional Service). This section has also been titled Purity of Heart is to Will One Thing

Kierkegaard asks how an individual can find out if they are on the "right" path in life. Confession and repentance before God is his answer with a warning about double-mindedness. If a single individual were to ask themself all the questions asked in this section and try to discover all the evasions used to keep from acting single-mindedly, that person would discover that it is very difficult to say I am innocent. In Works of Love (1847) he asks his reader to "Imagine an enthusiast who enthusiastically wills only one thing and enthusiastically wants to sacrifice everything for the good." Here he is writing about the inwardness of prayer. He says, 

He asks, "What does the conscience want to emphasize by means of the awareness that you are a single individual?" (Hong p. 132) He answers this way: To will, in the decision, to be and to remain with the good is truth's brief expression for willing to do everything, and in this expression the equality is maintained that recognizes no distinction with regard to that more essential diversity of life or of the human condition: to be acting or to be suffering, since the one who is suffering can, in the decision, also be with the good. …. With respect to the highest, with respect to willing to do everything, it makes no difference at all, God be praised, how big or how little the task. Oh, how merciful the eternal is to us human beings! Soren Kierkegaard, Upbuilding Discourses in Various Spirits, Hong p. 79–80

Later, in Works of Love, Kierkegaard sums up the essence of what it means to have a pure heart using a metaphors from Archimedes and the New Testament.

What we Learn from the Lilies in the Field and from the Birds in the Air 
The first discourse (To Be Contented with Being a Human Being) deals with comparison and choice and how to trust God with the choice once made. He may have been echoing Goethe's Propylaen in which Goethe had written "The youth, when Nature and Art attract him, thinks that with a vigorous effort he can soon penetrate into the innermost sanctuary; the man, after long wanderings, finds himself still in the outer court. Such an observation has suggested our title. It is only on the step, in the gateway, the entrance, the vestibule, the space between the outside and the inner chamber, between the sacred and the common, that we may ordinarily tarry with our friends." Kierkegaard writes about nature differently than Goethe but similarly because both see Nature as teachers of human kind and Kierkegaard wrote very much about "the inner being"; the soul.

Kierkegaard wrote a great story about a lily and a naughty bird. It begins like this: 

The second discourse deals with diverting oneself from worries by "learning from the bird how glorious it is to be a human being." David F. Swenson translated several of Kierkegaard's discourses which were published in 1958 through the efforts of Paul L Holmer. Kierkegaard wrote of The Glory of Our Common Humanity. This was the second of three discourses that were all based on the text from Matthew 6 verses 24 to the end. It was titled How Glorious It Is to Be a Human Being by Howard V Hong when he translated Kierkegaard's book in 1993.

The structure of the three discourses about the lilies and the birds is as follows: the first is esthetic, the second ethical, the third religious. Journal and Papers of Soren Kierkegaard VIII A 1 1847

Kierkegaard writes about the gift given to human beings that nature doesn't have, conscience. With the use of conscience we can know about time and the future. Something nature cannot know. He sums the human ability to love and the distinctiveness of nature up in Works of Love, which he published four months later. 

The third discourse was titled What Blessed Happiness is Promised in Being a Human Being by Howard V Hong.  Kierkegaard is constantly stressing the importance there is in being a human being instead of a beast in the field because you have been given the gift of choice. "A choice. My listener, do you know how to express in a single word anything more glorious! If you talked year in and year out, could you mention anything more glorious than a choice, to have choice! It is certainly true that the sole blessing is to choose rightly, but certainly choice itself is the glorious condition." Kierkegaard began writing about this choice in his first book Either/Or where he wrote first as the aesthetic and then as the ethicist. Hegel thinks that history and philosophy should come afterwards and explain events. Kierkegaard thinks its better to come beforehand.Only one word more concerning the desire to teach the world what it ought to be. For such a purpose philosophy at least always comes too late. Philosophy, as the thought of the world, does not appear until reality has completed its formative process, and made itself ready. History thus corroborates the teaching of the conception that only in the maturity of reality does the ideal appear as counterpart to the real, apprehends the real world in its substance, and shapes it into an intellectual kingdom. When philosophy paints its grey in grey, one form of life has become old, and by means of grey it cannot be rejuvenated, but only known. The owl of Minerva takes its flight only when the shades of night are gathering.
Georg Wilhelm Friedrich Hegel (1770–1831) Philosophy of Right translated by SW Dyde Queen's University Canada 1896 edition Preface xxxHang yourself, you will regret it; do not hang yourself, and you will also regret that; hang yourself or do not hang yourself, you will regret both; whether you hang yourself or do not hang yourself, you will regret both. This, gentlemen, is the sum and substance of all philosophy. It is only at certain moments that I view everything acterno modo, as Spinoza says, but I live constantly aeterno modo. There are many who think that they live thus, because after having done the one or the other, they combine or mediate the opposites. But this is a misunderstanding: for the true eternity does not lie behind either/or, but before it. Hence, their eternity will be a painful succession of temporal moments, for they will be consumed by a two-fold regret. 
Soren Kierkegaard, Either/Or part I, Swenson p. 37–39It is a sign of a well brought up child to be inclined to say it is sorry without too much pondering whether it is in the right or not, and it is likewise a sign of a high-minded person and a deep soul if he is inclined to repent, if he does not take God to court but repents and loves God in his repentance. Without this, his life is nothing, only like foam. Indeed, I assure you that if my life through no fault of my own were so interwoven with sorrows and sufferings that I could call myself the greatest tragic hero, could divert myself with my affliction and shock the world by naming it, my choice is made: I strip myself of the hero's garb and the pathos of tragedy; I am not the tormented one who can be proud of his sufferings; I am the humbled one who feels my offense; I have only one word for what I am suffering—guilt, only one word for my pain—repentance, only one hope before my eyes—forgiveness. And if it proves to be difficult for me to do—oh, then I have only one prayer. I would throw myself upon the earth and appeal from morning till night to the heavenly power who rules the world for one favor, that it might be granted me to repent, for I know only one sorrow that could bring me to despair and plunge everything into it—that repentance is an illusion, an illusion not with respect to the forgiveness it seeks but with respect to the imputation it presupposes. 
Soren Kierkegaard, Either/Or part II, Hong  p. 237–238Spiritually understood, temporality and eternity are two magnitudes that are to be weighed. But in order to deliberate the person in turn must be a third party or have a third position in relation to the two magnitudes. This is the choice: he weighs, he deliberates, he chooses. Here, however there is never any chance that the two magnitudes weigh equally much, which can of course happen with a scale, it indicates the relation as one of equality. No, praise God, that can never happen, because properly understood the eternal already has a certain overweight and the person who refuses to understand this can never begin really to deliberate. So a person deliberates before he begins. 
Soren Kierkegaard, Upbuilding Discourses in Various Spirits, 1847, Hong p. 306–307

Kierkegaard stresses not only having a choice but learning how to use it. He concludes, "But then in his sadness out there with the lily and the bird the worried one did indeed acquire something other than his worry to think about; he began to consider what blessed happiness is promised in being a human being. Then let the lily wither and let its loveliness become indiscernible; let the leaf fall to the ground and the bird fly away; let it become dark on the fields—God's kingdom does not change with the seasons! So let the rest be needed for a long time or a short time, let all these things have their moment when they are lacking or possessed, their moment is a subject of discussion until in death they are eternally forgotten—God's kingdom is still that which is to be sought first but which ultimately will also last through all eternities, and "if that which will be abolished was glorious, that which remains will be more glorious,: and if it was hard to live in want, then it must indeed be only an easier separation to die to want!

The Gospel of Sufferings
A.S Aldworth and W.S. Ferrie from Cambridge University translated The Gospel of Sufferings in 1955. The following is from his introduction. 

Now he begins to write of the meaning and joy there is in following Christ. It wasn't the first thing he wrote about but he did write about learning, over time, to follow Christ and while learning to also learn to confess, repent and accept as well as give forgiveness. His emphasis has been on seeking God's kingdom first (Matthew 6:33) and learning to be "silent before God".

His first three texts are from Luke 14:27 Whoever does not carry his cross and come after me cannot be my disciple.  Matthew 11:30 My yoke is beneficial, and my burden light. and It is said of him the Lord Jesus Christ: Although he was a son, he learned obedience from what he suffered Hebrews 5:8. Acts 5:41 Kierkegaard writes about why it might not be so great to have the "distinction" of being an apostle. they went away joyful because they had been deemed worthy to be scorned for the sake of Christ's name. He concluded this way: 

Kierkegaard compared a pound of gold and a pound of feathers. He views the pound of feathers as a lesser weight because of the value of gold compared to feathers. He then asks the reader to decide if a pound of temporality is equal to a pound of eternity. Feathers and gold and temporality and eternity and numbers all have value in this world. He has seven different discourses in this third section. He seems to be using religious numbers generally while writing but always referring to Christianity specifically.

Kierkegaard seems to have fulfilled his goal presented in Concluding Unscientific Postscript, where he said it had become clear to him that people had forgotten what it means to be religious (confession and repentance before God) and had also forgotten what it means to be a human being and had therefore also forgotten what it means to try to become a Christian. He put it this way.

Criticism
Edifiying Discourses in Diverse Spirits, also Upbuilding Discourses in Various Spirits was published on March 13, 1847, and is one of the first books in Søren Kierkegaard's second authorship. His first authorship included all of his books up to and including Two Ages: A Literary Review which was published March 30, 1846. He had just published his Concluding Unscientific Postscript to Philosophical Fragments on February 27, 1846. He wrote both pseudonymous books as well as books signed by his own name. His Eighteen Upbuilding Discourses were all signed by Soren Kierkegaard as author while other books, such as, Either/Or, Repetition, and The Concept of Anxiety were published under pseudonyms. Howard V. Hong says the book had no record of sales and was not reprinted in Kierkegaard's lifetime.

Previously Kierkegaard had published his own books through two different bookstores, Bookdealer P. G. Philipsen Three Upbuilding Discourses, 1843 and C.A. Reitzel's, Printed by Biance Luno Press Repetition. This book was published "on an honorarium basis" through another Danish book publisher, Reitzel Forlag. The publishing cost was minimum.

The first section was translated into English in 1938 by Douglas V. Steere and titled Purity of Heart Is To Will One Thing. Steere also wrote the introduction to David F Swenson's 1946 translation of Works of Love. Howard V. and Edna H. Hong translated all the discourses and Princeton University Press published them in 1993. Scholars generally paid more attention to his pseudonymous writings than his discourses.

Harold Victor Martin published Kierkegaard, the Melancholy Dane (1950) and had this to say about this book: 
Robert L Perkins of Stetson University edited The International Kierkegaard Commentary Upbuilding Discourses in Various Spirits in 2005. This book presents scholarly perspectives from people interested in the writings of Soren Kierkegaard. He states that A.S. Aldworth and W.S. Ferrie published Upbuilding Discourses in Various Spirits in three parts Purify your Hearts (1937), Consider the Lilies (1940) and Gospel of Suffering (1955), the 1955 edition was reprinted in an American edition in 1964. Gospel of Sufferings and The Lilies of the Field were translated by David F Swenson and Lillian Marvin Swenson in 1948. Perkin's book is in External Links below.

Douglas V. Steere wrote a lengthy introduction to his 1938 publication of the first part of Upbuilding Discourses in Various Spirits. Purify your Heart of 1937 became Purity of Heart is to Will One Thing in the hands of Steere in 1938. He says Eduard Geismar (1871–1939), the Danish scholar, said of the book, "It seems to me that nothing that he has written has sprung so directly out of his relationship with God as this address. Anyone who wishes to understand Kierkegaard properly will do well to begin with it."

Steere wrote Doors Into Life in 1948 and devoted his fourth chapter to Kierkegaard and Purity of Heart. He said, "In a strangely universal way, Kierkegaard is both ancient and modern, both a fierce desert prophet and a metropolitan sophisticate who is all too well schooled in the artifices of modern life to be deceived by them."

Geismar lectured on Kierkegaard at Princeton University in 1936. He wrote the following about this book, 

Howard V Hong translated the wrote book in 1993 along with his wife Edna H Hong. It was translated again in 2005. Hong's 1993 introduction surmised that Kierkegaard perhaps published 500 copies of this book during his lifetime.

Three Discourses on Imagined Occasions & Upbuilding Discourses in Various Spirits were reviewed together in 1994 by Karl Dusza for First Things Magazine He wrote 

Kierkegaard wrote about the expectation of the Christian. The difference Christ made in the world is that he took away the burdens of the Christian. Kierkegaard wrote much about the consciousness of sin and wrote about the difference Christianity makes. 

James Collins, from Saint Louis University, wrote the following about Kierkegaard's Gospel of Suffering in 1953. "Find a point which is under fire by an atheist of the nineteenth century and which is also defended by a seventeenth century man of faith and you have found an incontrovertibly religious belief. Such is the case with suffering, which is a scandal to a Feuerbach and a matter of glory to a Pascal, but to both a distinguishing note of the Christian mode of existence. In the degree that it promotes a meditative inwardness, Christianity makes us aware of God's supreme goodness and our own distance from, and hostility towards, His holiness. A religious sense of one's own sinfulness leads neither to morbid despair nor to rationalization. It issues in a voluntary acceptance of suffering as a way of atoning for sin to God, the just judge, and a way of approaching closer to God the redeemer. In a series of discourses entitled The Gospel of Suffering, Kierkegaard establishes the relation between guilt, suffering, and the triumph of faith, much after the manner of Luther's dialectical treatment of the theme of the sinner as a believer."

Notes

References

Sources
 Upbuilding Discourses in Various Spirits translated by Howard V & Edna H Hong. Princeton University Press, 1993. 
 Hong, Howard V. & Edna H. The Essential Kierkegaard. Princeton University Press, 2000.
 D. Anthony Storm's Commentary on Discourses

External links

 Purity of Heart Steere translation – whole text in English
 Purity of Heart Is to Will One Thing by Sören Kierkegaard Translator's Introduction by Douglas V. Steere 1938
 The Glory of Our Common Humanity David F Swenson's translation of How Glorious It Is to Be a Human Being from What We Learn From the Lilies in the Field and From the Birds of the Air
 The Joy in the Thought That it is not the Way Which is Narrow, but the Narrowness Which is the Way David F Swenson's translation of The Joy of it That it Is Not the Road That Is Hard but That Hardship Is the Road published 1958 from The Gospel of Sufferings, Christian Discourses
 The Road is the How Upbuilding Discourses in Various Spirits published in 1847, Hong's p. 289 Audio Reading
 Clifford Williams The Divided Soul: A Kierkegaardian Exploration 2009 - A Study of Purity of Heart
 Silvia Walsh - On Becoming a Person of Character Discussion of Kierkegaard's views on Christianity
 Robert L. Perkins International Kierkegaard Commentary Upbuilding Discourses in Various Spirits Mercer University Press, 2005
 Chronology of Kierkegaard's works from Kierkegaard Internet Resources

1847 books
Books by Søren Kierkegaard
Christian literature
Ethics
Suffering
Psychology books